Christmas Special is a festive album released in 2010 by The Boy Least Likely To. The song "The First Snowflake" was featured in the episode "Adrift and at Peace" from season 7 of Grey's Anatomy.

Track listing
 "The Christmas Waltz" – 1:42
 "Happy Christmas Baby" – 3:31
 "Blue Spruce Needles" – 3:45
 "Little Donkey" – 2:46
 "Christmas Isn't Christmas" – 3:14
 "The Wassail Song" – 1:54
 "Jingle My Bells" – 1:40
 "George and Andrew" – 4:01
 "In The Bleak Midwinter" – 2:14
 "I Can't Make It Snow" – 3:28
 "The First Snowflake" – 3:33

References

2010 Christmas albums
Christmas albums by English artists
Pop Christmas albums
The Boy Least Likely To albums